Jobe's test may refer to:
 Empty can test (technically termed Jobe's test), a physical examination maneuver that tests the integrity of the supraspinatus muscle and tendon.
 Jobe's relocation test, a physical examination maneuver used in tandem with the Apprehension test to detect anterior shoulder instability.
 In the Manga "The Seven Deadly Sins" Jobe's test is a skill of Goddess Clan